The McLennan Handicap was an American thoroughbred horse race run annually each February from 1934–1961 at Hialeah Park Race Track in Hialeah, Florida. First run in 1934 as the Joseph McLennan Memorial Handicap, the race was named In honor of the late Joseph "Sandy" McLennan, the former racing secretary at Hialeah Park and at Chicago's  Arlington Park who died in December 1933.  In winning the first edition in 1934, Col. Edward R. Bradley's Blessed Event equaled the world record for a mile and an eighth on dirt.  In 1938 the race name was shortened to the McLennan Memorial Handicap and shortened again in 1948 to the McLennan Handicap.

In 1941 the race had twenty-five entries and had to be run in two divisions.

Records
Speed record:
 Spartan Valor - 1:47.20

Most wins by a jockey:
 2 - James Stout (1938, 1952)
 2 - Ted Atkinson (1944, 1949)

Most wins by a trainer:
 5 - Horace A. Jones (1947, 1949, 1958, 1960, 1961)

Most wins by an owner:
 6 - Calumet Farm (1944, 1947, 1949, 1958, 1960, 1961)

Winners

References

Discontinued horse races
Horse races in Florida
Hialeah Park
Widener family
Recurring sporting events established in 1934
Recurring sporting events disestablished in 1961
1934 establishments in Florida
1961 disestablishments in Florida